The American Railway Engineering and Maintenance-of-Way Association (AREMA) is a North American railway industry group. It publishes recommended practices for the design, construction and maintenance of railway infrastructure, which are used in the United States and Canada.

Overview
AREMA is headquartered in Lanham, Maryland, a suburb of Washington, D.C. As stated in their mission statement, AREMA promotes "The development and advancement of both technical and practical knowledge and recommended practices pertaining to the design, construction and maintenance of railway infrastructure." AREMA recognizes outstanding achievements in railway engineering with the annual William Walter Hay Award.

Beth Caruso was appointed as AREMA's Executive Director/CEO in September 2015. Prior to this appointment, she served as AREMA's Director of Administration. Trent Hudak is the AREMA President and Chairman of the Board of Governors for 2022-23.

History
AREMA was established on October 1, 1997, by the merger of four engineering associations:
the American Railway Engineering Association
the American Railway Bridge and Building Association
the Roadmasters and Maintenance of Way Association
the Communications and Signal Division of the Association of American Railroads

These four organizations have devoted a total of over 400 years of service to the rail industry prior to merging into AREMA.

American Railway Engineering Association
Formed in 1899, it began publishing the Manual for Railway Engineering in 1905 and established many technical committees which are still functioning today in AREMA.  It was headquartered in Chicago until 1979, when it moved to Washington, DC.

American Railway Bridge and Building Association
Formed in 1891 in St. Louis, Missouri, as the American International Association of Railway Superintendents of Bridges and Buildings, the Association initially represented 40 railroads. The name was changed in 1907 to the American Railway Bridge and Building Association. The group provided a forum to exchange information and create solutions to problems that confront the railway industry.

Roadmasters and Maintenance of Way Association
The oldest of the groups was organized in 1883 by 61 roadmasters representing 24 railways. The Association provided a means for maintenance officers to meet and discuss their mutual problems. Rail joints, switches, frogs and ties were among the subjects studied, leading to the standardization of maintenance practices.

Communications and Signal Division of the Association of American Railroads
In 1885, the Association of Telegraph and Telephone Superintendents was formed by the telegraph superintendents of the major railroads. In 1895, the Railway Signaling Club was organized at a meeting in Chicago, Illinois, and created a code of rules governing the operation of interlockings. In 1919, the Signaling Club became the Signal Division of the newly created American Railway Association (ARA) and the Telegraph Superintendents became its Telegraph and Telephone Section. The ARA became the Association of American Railroads (AAR) in 1934; the Signal Division was renamed the Signal Section and the Telegraph and Telephone was renamed the Communications Section. The two sections merged in 1961 to become the Communications and Signal Division of the AAR, which has now been merged into AREMA.

Technical committees
AREMA has 29 technical committees, organized in six functional groups. The committees, whose volunteer members come from the railroad industry, meet on a regular basis and use their expertise to come up with the best methods to maintain a railroad.
Structures
Timber Structures (Committee 7)
Concrete Structures & Foundations (Committee 8)
Seismic Design for Railway Structures (Committee 9)
Structures Maintenance & Construction (Committee 10)
Steel Structures (Committee 15)
Clearances (Committee 28)
Passenger & Transit
Commuter & Intercity Rail Systems (Committee 11)
Rail Transit (Committee 12)
High Speed Rail Systems (Committee 17)
Electric Energy Utilization (Committee 33)
Track
Roadway & Ballast (Committee 1)
Rail (Committee 4)
Track (Committee 5)
Maintenance of Way Work Equipment (Committee 27)
Ties (Committee 30)
Engineering Services
Track Measuring and Assessment Systems (Committee 2)
Building & Support Facilities (Committee 6)
Environmental (Committee 13)
Yards & Terminals (Committee 14)
Economics of Railway Engineering & Operations (Committee 16)
Light Density & Short Line Railways (Committee 18)
Education & Training (Committee 24)
Communications & Signals
Scales (Committee 34)
Highway-Rail Grade Crossing Warning Systems (Committee 36)
Signal Systems (Committee 37)
Information, Defect Detection & Energy Systems (Committee 38)
Positive Train Control (Committee 39)
Maintenance
Engineering Safety Steering Team (Committee 40)
Track Maintenance Steering Team (Committee 41)
Signals Maintenance Steering Team (Committee 43)

Recommended practices
AREMA publishes recommended practices in nine separate documents. Manual for Railway Engineering, Communications and Signals Manual, Practical Guide to Railway Engineering, and the Bridge inspection Handbook are four of AREMA's prime publications.

Manual for Railway Engineering
The AREMA Manual for Railway Engineering contains principles, data, specifications, plans and economics pertaining to the engineering, design and construction of the fixed plant of railways (except signals and communications), and allied services and facilities.

21 chapters are contained in four volumes, updated annually by the technical committees.

Consultants use the manual's recommendations as a basis for design. Many railroads use the manual as a basis for their track standards and may add to it to describe their specific needs.

Communications & Signals Manual of Recommended Practices
The AREMA Communications & Signals Manual of Recommended Practices contains recommended practices for railway communications and signaling.
 
24 sections are contained in five volumes, written and updated by the AREMA committees.

Administrative & General
Railroad Signal Systems
Highway-Rail Grade Crossing Warning Systems
Yard Systems
Defect Detection Systems
Relays
Signals
Track Circuits
Power Supply
Wire & Electrical Cable
Circuit Protection
Switches
Mechanical
Electrical Devices, Foundations, Hardware Materials
Materials
Vital Circuit & Software Design
Quality Principles
Inside Plant
Electrical Protection
Inductive Interference
Data Transmission
Radio
Communication-based Signaling
Positive Train Control

These practices are required for railroads in the United States by the Federal Railroad Administration and in Canada by Transport Canada.

Proceedings online
An electronic version of AREMA's Procedures and Proceedings is available to members. The extensive library includes over 65 years of technical proceedings taken from the Roadmasters & Maintenance of Way Association proceedings and the American Railway Bridge and Building Association proceedings. Earlier Proceedings of the Annual Convention are available as digitized books.

References

External links
 AREMA website

Transportation associations in the United States
Rail infrastructure in the United States
Rail infrastructure in Canada
Railway signaling in Canada
Railway signaling in the United States
Railway associations
Standards organizations in the United States
1997 establishments in Maryland
Organizations established in 1997
Organizations based in Maryland